In mathematics, a Cauchy sequence, named after Augustin-Louis Cauchy, is a sequence whose elements become arbitrarily close to each other as the sequence progresses. More precisely, given any small positive distance, all but a finite number of elements of the sequence are less than that given distance from each other.

It is not sufficient for each term to become arbitrarily close to the  term. For instance, in the sequence of square roots of natural numbers:

the consecutive terms become arbitrarily close to each other:

However, with growing values of the index , the terms  become arbitrarily large. So, for any index  and distance , there exists an index  big enough such that  (Actually, any  suffices.)

The utility of Cauchy sequences lies in the fact that in a complete metric space (one where all such sequences are known to converge to a limit), the criterion for convergence depends only on the terms of the sequence itself, as opposed to the definition of convergence, which uses the limit value as well as the terms. This is often exploited in algorithms, both theoretical and applied,  where an iterative process can be shown relatively easily to produce a Cauchy sequence, consisting of the iterates, thus fulfilling a logical condition, such as termination. 

Generalizations of Cauchy sequences in more abstract uniform spaces exist in the form of Cauchy filters and Cauchy nets.

In real numbers
A sequence

of real numbers is called a Cauchy sequence if for every positive real number  there is a positive integer N such that for all natural numbers 

where the vertical bars denote the absolute value.  In a similar way one can define Cauchy sequences of rational or complex numbers.  Cauchy formulated such a condition by requiring  to be infinitesimal for every pair of infinite m, n.

For any real number r, the sequence of truncated decimal expansions of r forms a Cauchy sequence.  For example, when  this sequence is (3, 3.1, 3.14, 3.141, ...).  The mth and nth terms differ by at most  when m < n, and as m grows this becomes smaller than any fixed positive number

Modulus of Cauchy convergence

If  is a sequence in the set  then a modulus of Cauchy convergence for the sequence is a function  from the set of natural numbers to itself, such that for all natural numbers  and natural numbers  

Any sequence with a modulus of Cauchy convergence is a Cauchy sequence. The existence of a modulus for a Cauchy sequence follows from the well-ordering property of the natural numbers (let  be the smallest possible  in the definition of Cauchy sequence, taking  to be ). The existence of a modulus also follows from the principle of dependent choice, which is a weak form of the axiom of choice, and it also follows from an even weaker condition called AC00. Regular Cauchy sequences are sequences with a given modulus of Cauchy convergence (usually  or ). Any Cauchy sequence with a modulus of Cauchy convergence is equivalent to a regular Cauchy sequence; this can be proven without using any form of the axiom of choice.

Moduli of Cauchy convergence are used by constructive mathematicians who do not wish to use any form of choice. Using a modulus of Cauchy convergence can simplify both definitions and theorems in constructive analysis.

In a metric space

Since the definition of a Cauchy sequence only involves metric concepts, it is straightforward to generalize it to any metric space X. 

Formally, given a metric space  a sequence

is Cauchy, if for every positive real number  there is a positive integer  such that for all positive integers  the distance

Roughly speaking, the terms of the sequence are getting closer and closer together in a way that suggests that the sequence ought to have a limit in X. 
Nonetheless, such a limit does not always exist within X: the property of a space that every Cauchy sequence converges in the space is called completeness, and is detailed below.

Completeness
A metric space (X, d) in which every Cauchy sequence converges to an element of X is called complete.

Examples
The real numbers are complete under the metric induced by the usual absolute value, and one of the standard constructions of the real numbers involves Cauchy sequences of rational numbers. In this construction, each equivalence class of Cauchy sequences of rational numbers with a certain tail behavior—that is, each class of sequences that get arbitrarily close to one another— is a real number.

A rather different type of example is afforded by a metric space X which has the discrete metric (where any two distinct  points are at distance 1 from each other). Any Cauchy sequence of elements of X must be constant beyond some fixed point, and converges to the eventually repeating term.

Non-example: rational numbers
The rational numbers  are not complete (for the usual distance):
There are sequences of rationals that converge (in ) to irrational numbers; these are Cauchy sequences having no limit in  In fact, if a real number x is irrational, then the sequence (xn), whose n-th term is the truncation to n decimal places of the decimal expansion of x, gives a Cauchy sequence of rational numbers with irrational limit x.

 The sequence defined by  consists of rational numbers (1, 3/2, 17/12,...), which is clear from the definition; however it converges to the irrational square root of two, see Babylonian method of computing square root.
 The sequence  of ratios of consecutive Fibonacci numbers which, if it converges at all, converges to a limit  satisfying  and no rational number has this property.  If one considers this as a sequence of real numbers, however, it converges to the real number  the Golden ratio, which is irrational.
 The values of the exponential, sine and cosine functions, exp(x), sin(x), cos(x), are known to be irrational for any rational value of  but each can be defined as the limit of a rational Cauchy sequence, using, for instance, the Maclaurin series.

Non-example: open interval

Other properties
 Every convergent sequence (with limit s, say) is a Cauchy sequence, since, given any real number  beyond some fixed point, every term of the sequence is within distance  of s, so any two terms of the sequence are within distance  of each other.
 In any metric space, a Cauchy sequence which has a convergent subsequence with limit s is itself convergent (with the same limit), since, given any real number r > 0, beyond some fixed point in the original sequence, every term of the subsequence is within distance r/2 of s, and any two terms of the original sequence are within distance r/2 of each other, so every term of the original sequence is within distance r of s.

These last two properties, together with the Bolzano–Weierstrass theorem, yield one standard proof of the completeness of the real numbers, closely related to both the Bolzano–Weierstrass theorem and the Heine–Borel theorem. Every Cauchy sequence of real numbers is bounded, hence by Bolzano–Weierstrass has a convergent subsequence, hence is itself convergent. This proof of the completeness of the real numbers implicitly makes use of the least upper bound axiom. The alternative approach, mentioned above, of  the real numbers as the completion of the rational numbers, makes the completeness of the real numbers tautological.

One of the standard illustrations of the advantage of being able to work with Cauchy sequences and make use of completeness is provided by consideration of the summation of an infinite series of real numbers
(or, more generally, of elements of any complete normed linear space, or Banach space).  Such a series 
 is considered to be convergent if and only if the sequence of partial sums  is convergent, where   It is a routine matter to determine whether the sequence of partial sums is Cauchy or not, since for positive integers 

Generalizations

In topological vector spaces
There is also a concept of Cauchy sequence for a topological vector space : Pick a local base  for  about 0; then is a Cauchy sequence if for each member  there is some number  such that whenever 

In topological groups

Since the topological vector space definition of Cauchy sequence requires only that there be a continuous "subtraction" operation, it can just as well be stated in the context of a topological group: A sequence  in a topological group  is a Cauchy sequence if for every open neighbourhood  of the identity in  there exists some number  such that whenever  it follows that  As above, it is sufficient to check this for the neighbourhoods in any local base of the identity in 

It is symmetric since  which by continuity of the inverse is another open neighbourhood of the identity.

In groups

There is also a concept of Cauchy sequence in a group :

One can then show that this completion is isomorphic to the inverse limit of the sequence 

If  is a cofinal sequence (that is, any normal subgroup of finite index contains some ), then this completion is canonical in the sense that it is isomorphic to the inverse limit of  where  varies over  normal subgroups of finite index. For further details, see Ch. I.10 in Lang's "Algebra".

In a hyperreal continuum
A real sequence  has a natural hyperreal extension, defined for hypernatural values H of the index n in addition to the usual natural n.
 
where "st" is the standard part function.

Cauchy completion of categories
 introduced a notion of Cauchy completion of a category.

See also

References

Further reading

 (for uses in constructive mathematics)

External links
 

Augustin-Louis Cauchy
Metric geometry
Topology
Abstract algebra
Sequences and series
Convergence (mathematics)